Ramat HaKovesh is a kibbutz in central Israel. Located approximately 7 kilometers north of Kfar Saba, it falls under the jurisdiction of the Drom HaSharon Regional Council.

History
Before the 20th century the area formed part of the Forest of Sharon. It was an open woodland dominated by Mount Tabor Oak, which extended from Kfar Yona in the north to Ra'anana in the south. The local Arab inhabitants traditionally used the area for pasture, firewood and intermittent cultivation. The intensification of settlement and agriculture in the coastal plain during the 19th century led to deforestation and subsequent environmental degradation.

The kibbutz was founded by Zionist youth from the Hashomer Hatzair and HeHalutz movements, including Jews from Wizna. A Vishnivean group of the HeHalutz movement immigrated to Mandate Palestine in 1926. They formed the nucleus of kibbutz "HaKovesh", which was initially camped near the settlement (now city) of Petah Tikva. In 1936, a parcel of land was purchased from an Arab family in an area surrounded by three Arab villages. The pioneers settled on this land, but suffered from ongoing sniping and acts of violence until the establishment of the State of Israel in 1948.

On 16 November 1943 the British military searched the kibbutz for arms on the pretext of searching for deserters from the Polish Army, which was then stationed in Palestine. The kibbutz members resisted and a violent confrontation ensued. One kibbutz member, Shmuel Wolynetz, was killed, 14 were wounded, and the British arrested 35.

In November 1945, following a series of country wide operations launched by the Haganah a Palestine Police party with police dogs were prevented from entering the kibbutz. The police party received orders from Jerusalem to withdraw and it became a no-go area for British forces.

The kibbutz extends over a tract of land, the "al-Banna orchard", owned by Hajj Khalil al-Banna, the father of Abu Nidal.

Economy
The kibbutz owns and operates Duram Rubber Products Company, a manufacturer of technical rubber products. Duram Mask A.C. Ltd., a subsidiary. manufactures the Duram Escape Mask, special emergency escape masks for personal use in situations of smoke, fire, chemical spill or chemical/biological terror attack. As well as agricultural produce, Ramat HaKovesh also has a small chicken barn and a refet (dairy).

Kibbutz Ramat Hakovesh operates a wedding and banquet hall, Pekan Garden.

PowerCom, a company based in Ramat Hakovesh, produces a remote monitoring system that collects data from solar systems and sends information to an online server that can be accessed from computers anywhere in the world.

Notable people

 Sara Levi-Tanai (1910–2005), choreographer and song writer

References

Kibbutzim
Kibbutz Movement
Populated places established in 1932
Populated places in Central District (Israel)
1932 establishments in Mandatory Palestine
Polish-Jewish culture in Israel